I Live Alone is Fann Wong's (Chinese: 范文芳) Fanntasy album repackaged with two additional songs for the Taiwanese music market. It was released on 12 September 1997.

Track listing
一個人生活
別讓情兩難(与張信哲合唱)
心事
假戲真作
化妝
被愛的權利
每個夢
星光 
愛曾經來過
吹散為你留下的夢

Fann Wong albums
1997 albums